Induction or inductive may refer to:

Biology and medicine 
 Labor induction (birth/pregnancy)
 Induction chemotherapy, in medicine
 Induced stem cells, stem cells derived from somatic, reproductive, pluripotent or other cell types by deliberate epigenetic reprogramming
 Cellular differentiation, the process where a cell changes from one cell type to another
 Enzyme induction and inhibition, a process in which a molecule induces the expression of an enzyme
 Morphogenesis, the biological process that causes an organism to develop its shape
 Regulation of gene expression, the means by which a gene product is either induced or inhibited

Chemistry 
 Induction period, the time interval between cause and measurable effect
 Inductive cleavage, in organic chemistry
 Inductive effect, the redistribution of electron density through molecular sigma bonds
 Asymmetric induction, the formation of one specific stereoisomer in the presence of a nearby chiral center

Computing 

 Grammar induction, in computing
 Inductive bias, in computing
 Inductive probability, in computing
 Inductive programming, in computing
 Rule induction, in computing
 Word-sense induction, in computing

Mathematics 
 Backward induction in game theory and economics
 Induced representation, in representation theory
 Mathematical induction, a method of proof in the field of mathematics
 Parabolic induction, a method of constructing group representations
 Statistical induction, also known as statistical inference
 Strong induction, or complete induction, a variant of mathematical induction
 Structural induction, a generalization of mathematical induction
 Transfinite induction, a kind of mathematical induction
 Epsilon-induction, a kind of transfinite induction

Philosophy 
 Inductive reasoning, in logic, inferences from particular cases to the general case

Physics 
 Electromagnetic induction in physics and engineering
 Electrostatic induction in physics and engineering
 Forced induction, with combustion engines

Other uses 
 Induction (play), an opening scene in a play
 Induction (teachers), a stage in teacher training
 Inductive reasoning aptitude, an aptitude or personality characteristic
 Collective Induction, in psychology
 Hypnotic induction, process to establish the state required for hypnosis
 Formal admission into a learned society or hall of fame

See also 
 Inducement (disambiguation)
 Induce (disambiguation)
 Inductive data type (disambiguation)
 Deduction (disambiguation)